Malem, which literally translates to "Moon", is one of the five municipalities that comprise the state of Kosrae in the Federated States of Micronesia.

The village gets its name from the fact that the full moon rises every month out of the ocean directly in front of the rocky beach at the edge of the village. Malem has an elementary school housing close to 400 students in grades KG-9. It also has a small Baptist church and a large Congregational church (the predominant religion on the island) and a municipality office.

Education
Kosrae State Department of Education operates Malem Elementary School. High school students attend Kosrae High School in Tofol, Lelu municipality.

Climate
Malem has a tropical rainforest climate (Af) with very heavy rainfall year-round.

Notable people 

 Adelyn Noda - teacher and deaconess.

References

Municipalities of Kosrae